Thubten Chodron ( — De Lin), born Cheryl Greene, is an American Tibetan Buddhist nun, author, teacher, and the founder and abbess of Sravasti Abbey, the only Tibetan Buddhist training monastery for Western nuns and monks in the United States. Chodron is a central figure in the reinstatement of the Bhikshuni (Tib. Gelongma) ordination of women. She is a student of the 14th Dalai Lama, Tsenzhab Serkong Rinpoche, Lama Thubten Yeshe, Thubten Zopa Rinpoche, and other Tibetan masters. She has published many books on Buddhist philosophy and meditation, and is co-authoring with the Dalai Lama a multi-volume series of teachings on the Buddhist path, The Library of Wisdom and Compassion.

Biography
Born in 1950, Thubten Chodron grew up in a "non-religious Jewish" family near Los Angeles, California, and earned her B.A. in history from University of California at Los Angeles in 1971. After traveling through Europe, North Africa and Asia for one and a half years, she received a teaching credential and went to the University of Southern California to do post-graduate work in education while working as a teacher in the Los Angeles City School System. In 1975, she attended a meditation course given by Lama Thubten Yeshe and Kyabje Thubten Zopa Rinpoche, and subsequently went to Kopan Monastery in Nepal to continue studying Buddhism. In 1977 she was ordained as a Buddhist nun by Kyabje Ling Rinpoche in Dharamshala, and in 1986 she received bhikshuni (full) ordination in Taiwan.

Chodron has studied and practiced Buddhism in the Tibetan tradition extensively in India and Nepal under the guidance of the 14th Dalai Lama, Tsenzhab Serkong Rinpoche, Lama Thubten Yeshe, Thubten Zopa Rinpoche and other Tibetan masters and for three years at Dorje Pamo Monastery in France. She directed the spiritual program at Istituto Lama Tzong Khapa in Italy for nearly two years, was resident teacher at Amitabha Buddhist Centre in Singapore, and for 10 years was spiritual director and resident teacher at Dharma Friendship Foundation in Seattle, US.

Emphasizing the practical application of the Buddha's teachings in daily life, Chodron tries to explain them in ways easily understood and practised by Westerners. She has worked on re-establishing the Bhikshuni lineage of Buddhist nuns, cultivating interfaith dialogue, and Dharma outreach in prisons. Seeing the importance and necessity of a monastery for Westerners training in the Tibetan Buddhist tradition, she founded Sravasti Abbey, a Buddhist monastic community north of Spokane, Washington, and is the abbess there. It is the only Tibetan Buddhist training monastery for Western monks and nuns in America.

Chodron is also author or editor of more than 25 books on Buddhism, including two works co-written with the 14th Dalai Lama: Buddhism: One Teacher, Many Traditions and Approaching the Buddhist Path, the first in a multi-volume collection presenting the Dalai Lama's comprehensive explanation of the Buddhist path. Other popular works include Buddhism for Beginners; Open Heart, Clear Mind; Working with Anger; and Don't Believe Everything You Think.

Chodron was a co-organizer of Life as a Western Buddhist Nun, an international conference of Western Buddhist nuns held in 1996. She was a participant in the 1993 and 1994 Western Buddhist teachers' conferences with the 14th Dalai Lama, and she was instrumental in the creation of the 2007 International Congress on Buddhist Women's Role in the Sangha. She is a member of the Committee for Bhikshuni Ordination and attends the annual Western Buddhist Monastic Gathering in the US. Keen on interfaith dialogue, she was present during the Jewish delegation's visit to Dharamshala in 1990, which was the basis for Rodger Kamenetz’s The Jew in the Lotus, and she attended the Second Gethsemani Encounter in 2002. She has been present at several Mind and Life Institute conferences in which the 14th Dalai Lama dialogues with Western scientists.

Chodron travels worldwide to teach the Dharma: North America, Latin America, Singapore, Malaysia, India, and the former Soviet countries. Seeing the importance and necessity of a monastery for Westerners training in the Tibetan Buddhist tradition, she founded Sravasti Abbey, a Buddhist monastery in Newport, Washington, US, in 2003, and became its abbess.

In 2016 she was awarded the Global Bhikkhuni Award, presented by the Chinese Buddhist Bhikkhuni Association of Taiwan.

Teaching schedule
Chodron permanently resides at Sravasti Abbey in Washington, US, when she is not on her international teaching tours.

The abbey has a yearly program of weekly teachings as well as various teaching and meditation retreats:
 Thursday and Friday weekly teachings, which are broadcast via livestream.com and posted on the Sravasti Abbey YouTube channel;
 Annual 'Young Adults Explore Buddhism' program;
 Annual 'Exploring Monastic Life' three-week residential program for those thinking about becoming a Buddhist monk or nun;
 Annual month-long winter retreat;
 Various other courses and retreats.

Bibliography
Open Heart, Clear Mind. Paperback 224 pages; Publisher: Snow Lion Publications; (November 25, 1990) 
What Color Is Your Mind? Paperback 288 pages; Publisher: Snow Lion Publications; (1993) 
The Path to Happiness. eBook 68 pages; Publisher: Amitabha Buddhist Centre; (1999) 
Buddhism for Beginners. Paperback 160 pages; Publisher: Snow Lion Publications; (February 25, 2001) 
Working with Anger. Paperback 170 pages; Publisher: Snow Lion Publications; (October 25, 2001) 
Taming the Mind. Paperback 230 pages; Publisher: Snow Lion Publications; (September 25, 2004) 
How to Free Your Mind: Tara the Liberator. Paperback 224 pages; Publisher: Snow Lion Publications; (April 25, 2005) 
Transforming Our Daily Activities: A Practical Guide To Practising Buddhism In Daily Life. eBook 98 pages; Publisher: Kong Meng San Phor Kark See Monastery, Dharma Propagation Division, Awaken Publishing and Design; (May, 2005) 
Cultivating a Compassionate Heart: The Yoga Method of Chenrezig. Paperback 155 pages; Publisher: Snow Lion Publications; (April 25, 2006) 
Guided Meditations on the Stages of the Path. Paperback 154 pages; Publisher: Snow Lion Publications; (October 25, 2007) 
Dealing with Life's Issues: A Buddhist Perspective. eBook 192 pages; Publisher: Kong Meng San Phor Kark See Monastery, Dharma Propagation Division, Awaken Publishing and Design; (January, 2008) 
Don't Believe Everything You Think: Living With Wisdom and Compassion. Paperback 256 pages; Publisher: Snow Lion Publications; (January 8, 2013) 
Timeless Wisdom: Being the Knowing. NTSC DVD 109 minutes; Producer: Sweet Corn Productions; (January 28, 2013) ASIN B00B79WPCY
Living with an Open Heart: How to Cultivate Compassion in Everyday Life. Paperback 400 pages; Publisher: Robinson Publishing; (November 7, 2013) 
Buddhism: One Teacher, Many Traditions. Hardcover 352 pages; Publisher: Wisdom Publications; (November 11, 2014) 
An Open-Hearted Life: Transformative Methods for Compassionate Living from a Clinical Psychologist and a Buddhist Nun. Paperback 272 pages; Publisher: Shambhala; (March 3, 2015) 
Seven Tips for a Happy Life. eBook 38 pages; Publisher: Kong Meng San Phor Kark See Monastery, Dharma Propagation Division, Awaken Publishing and Design; (May, 2015) 
Good Karma: How to Create the Causes of Happiness and Avoid the Causes of Suffering. Paperback 272 pages; Publisher: Shambhala; 1 edition (August 9, 2016); 
Approaching the Buddhist Path. Hardcover 360 pages; Publisher: Wisdom Publications; 1 edition (August 15, 2017); 
The Compassionate Kitchen: Buddhist Practices for Eating with Mindfulness and Gratitude. Paperback 160 pages; Publisher: Shambhala; (December 11, 2018); 
The Foundation of Buddhist Practice. Hardcover 400 pages; Publisher: Wisdom Publications; (2018); 
Samsara, Nirvana, and Buddha Nature. Hardcover 440 pages; Publisher: Wisdom Publications; (2019); 
Unlocking Your Potential. 146 pages; Publisher:  (2019); 
Awaken Every Day: 365 Buddhist Reflections to Invite Mindfulness and Joy. Paperback 400 pages; Publisher: Shambhala; (June 2019); 
Following in the Buddha's Footsteps. Hardcover 552 pages; Publisher: Wisdom Publications; (October 2019); 
In Praise of Great Compassion. Hardcover 420 pages; Publisher: Wisdom Publications; (August 2020); 
Courageous Compassion. Hardcover 496 pages; Publisher: Wisdom Publications; (May 2021); 
Searching for the Self. Hardcover 456 pages; Publisher: Wisdom Publications; (May 2022); 

Edited by Chodron: 
Heruka Body Mandala Sadhana and Tsog and Commentary. eBook; Publisher: Sravasti Abbey; (1990) By request from Sravasti Abbey
Preparing for Ordination. eBook 104 pages; Publisher: Sravasti Abbey; (1996)
Blossoms of the Dharma: Living as a Buddhist Nun. Paperback 248 pages; Publisher: North Atlantic Books; (December 28, 1999) 
A Teaching on Heruka. eBook; Publisher: Lama Yeshe Wisdom Archive; (May, 2000)
A Teaching on Yamantaka. eBook; Publisher: Lama Yeshe Wisdom Archive; (May, 2000)
Choosing Simplicity: A Commentary on the Bhikshuni Pratimoksha. Paperback 300 pages; Publisher: Snow Lion Publications; (January 2, 2001) 
Transforming Adversity Into Joy and Courage. Paperback 320 pages; Publisher: Snow Lion Publications; (September 2, 2005) 
Pearl of Wisdom Buddhist Prayers and Practices: Book I. Spiral-bound 104 pages; Publisher: Sravasti Abbey; Sixth edition (July 1, 2011) 
Insight Into Emptiness. Paperback 296 pages; Publisher: Wisdom Publications; (July 31, 2012); 
Pearl of Wisdom Buddhist Prayers and Practices: Book II. Spiral-bound 95 pages; Publisher: Sravasti Abbey; Sixth edition (December 1, 2014) 
Karmans for the Creation of Virtue: The Prescriptive Precepts in the Dharmaguptaka Vinaya. Paperback 314 pages; Publisher: Sravasti Abbey; (April 23, 2015) 
Practical Ethics and Profound Emptiness: A Commentary on Nagarjuna's Precious Garland. Paperback 440 pages; Publisher: Wisdom Publications; (April 25, 2017)  [Note: This is the first complete English-language commentary on  Nagarjuna's Precious Garland of Advice for a King.]
Bhikṣu Poṣadha and Rites to Establish the Territory. eBook 80 pages; Publisher: Sravasti Abbey; (2017)
Bhikṣuṇī Poṣadha and Rites to Establish the Territory.eBook 86 pages; Publisher: Sravasti Abbey; (2017)
Pravrajyā and Śikṣamāṇā Ordination Rites. eBook 53 pages; Publisher: Sravasti Abbey; (2017)
Śikṣamāṇā Poṣadha and Other Rites.eBook 48 pages; Publisher: Sravasti Abbey; (2017)
Teachings and Rites for Śrāmaṇerī/as. eBook 70 pages; Publisher: Sravasti Abbey; (2017)
Varṣā, Pravāraṇā, and Kaṭhina Rites. eBook 108 pages; Publisher: Sravasti Abbey; (2017)
Refuge Resource Book. eBook 92 pages; Publisher: Sravasti Abbey; (2018)
Exploring Monastic Life. eBook 94 pages; Publisher: Sravasti Abbey; (2019)
Pearl of Wisdom Buddhist Prayers and Practices: Book III. eBook 80 pages; Publisher: Sravasti Abbey; First edition (August 2020)
Gavin Discovers the Secret to Happiness. Paperback 44 pages; Publisher: Sravasti Abbey; First edition (August 2021)

See also
Sravasti Abbey
Ordination of Women in Buddhism
Buddhism in the United States
Bhikkhuni

References

External links

Thubten Chodron's official website
Sravasti Abbey's official website
Committee for Bhikshuni Ordination
Western Buddhist Monastic Gathering 
Chodron’s newest book focuses on transforming mind to benefit self, others Interview with Spokane Faith and Values
"Mandala Talk: Ven. Thubten Chodron on “Insight into Emptiness”" Interview with FPMT's Mandala Magazine
"Buddhism’s Common Ground: An Interview with Ven. Thubten Chodron" Interview with FPMT's Mandala Magazine
"Disappointment and Delight: The eight worldly concerns." Interview with FPMT's Mandala Magazine
"Buddhists Monastics Get Together." Article on FPMT.org
"Cycles of Optimism: Buddhism's Challenges for Future Generations" Article on Patheos.com
"A Tibetan Buddhist Nun Blazes a Trail for Other Women to Follow" Interview in Tricycle Magazine
"The Truth About Gossip." Article in Tricycle Magazine
"How One Tibetan Buddhist Nun Is Blazing A Trail For Other Women To Follow." Article in The Huffington Post
"The Whole of the Spiritual Life: Two nuns, Thubten Chodron and Ayya Tathaaloka, discuss the vital importance of friendship." Interview in Tricycle Magazine
"Recognizing and Transforming Jealousy and Envy." Tricycle Online Retreat
"Comrades in Alms: Ven. Thubten Chodron discusses the challenges and joys of being a Western Buddhist monastic" Interview on Tricycle.org
"Kindness Vitamins with Thubten Chodron" Interview with Third Eye Drops
"8 North American Buddhist nuns, including Pema Chödrön and Thubten Chodron, receive “Global Bhikkhuni Award”" Article in Lion's Roar Magazine

Tibetan Buddhist nuns
Tibetan Buddhist spiritual teachers
American Buddhist nuns
20th-century American Jews
1950 births
Living people
Tibetan Buddhists from the United States
20th-century lamas
Buddhist abbesses
People from Chicago
People from Pend Oreille County, Washington
20th-century Buddhist nuns
21st-century Buddhist nuns
21st-century American Jews
20th-century American women
21st-century American women